The Burgoyne Bridge is a bridge in St. Catharines, Ontario, Canada. The original bridge was built in 1915 by the Dominion Steel and Coal Corporation. In 2010, construction of a new Burgoyne Bridge was recommended by the Niagara Region. However, the project was not completed until 2016 due to the estimated cost. The new bridge is 333 meters long and features a 125-metre main span supported by a steel arch.

Original bridge 

In 1915, the Burgoyne Bridge was constructed as a higher level bridge. A lower level swing bridge already existed in the area, but the Burgoyne Bridge was able to avoid the descent into a valley left by the old Welland Canal. Both bridges coexisted until 1942, when the swing bridge was removed so that the river channel could be widened to increase the hydroelectricity capacity at Decew Falls. A new wooden bridge was built to replace it and was used to accommodate traffic until Highway 406 was built.

Suicide location 
The new Burgoyne Bridge had a  gap between the two bridges on the road, which was considered to be dangerous to people who were suicidal. As of April 2019, the bridge averaged someone dying by suicide once a month. After a 19 year old died, more than 40 notes containing hopeful phrases were written by volunteers and placed on the bridge. Different measures were discussed to assist people in distress and to make the bridge safer. Some interim options studied by the public health department were the possibility of the installation of a distress phone or a mental health sanctuary as a small facility on site. In 2019, a project to install stainless steel netting as a suicide prevention measure was approved by the St. Catharines City Council. Construction of the stainless steel netting began in July 2020. The project was intended to be completed in the spring of 2020, but was delayed due to the COVID-19 pandemic in Ontario.

Legal disputes 
In 2016, an anonymous tip made allegations of fiduciary impropriety. A value-of-money audit was requested by the Niagara Region council after the estimated cost of the reconstruction went from $54 million to $91 million. A $500,000 audit was conducted by Deloitte Canada, the results of which were not released to the public. In March 2017, an investigation was launched by the Ontario Provincial Police into the budget of the bridge replacement project. The investigation took 21 months and concluded that there was no evidence of criminal wrongdoing. 

In 2019, Pomerleau Inc. filed a lawsuit against the Niagara Region for $10 million, alleging that additional expenses were not paid for by the municipality when constructing the bridge and that there were 15 changes for which they were not compensated. Pomerleau Inc. also alleged that these changes lead to delays in their construction of the bridge.

See also 
 Downtown St. Catharines
 Garden City Skyway
 List of bridges in Canada
 Suicide bridge

References 

Bridges in Ontario
Buildings and structures in St. Catharines
Transport in St. Catharines
Bridges completed in 1915
Road bridges in Ontario